Doing (stylized as doing) is the eleventh studio album by Japanese singer Shizuka Kudo. It was released on May 17, 1996, through Pony Canyon. The album's title is a nod to Kudo's active lifestyle and busy work schedule at the time of recording the album, which she was "doing" while filming two movies.

Critical reception
Kudo received acclaim for her vocal performance throughout the album: CDJournal critics praised her singing in a put-on "coqquetish" lisping voice, as well as regarding her low notes on "7" as well executed, and noted that Kudo's voice is best suited for ballads, despite also performing well on the more uptempo tracks of the record.

Commercial performance
Doing debuted at number 16 on the Oricon Albums Chart, with 20,000 units sold in its first week, marking Kudo's first album to debut outside of the top ten. It charted in the top 100 for five weeks, selling a reported total of 52,000 copies during its run.

Track listing

Charts

References

1996 albums
Shizuka Kudo albums
Pony Canyon albums